Chung Tian Temple is a Chan Buddhist temple located at 1034 Underwood Road, Priestdale, Queensland. The temple is part of the Fo Guang Shan Buddhist monastic order. Construction of the temple began in January 1991 and it opened in June 1993. Chung Tian Temple was founded by Venerable Master Hsing Yun, who is also the founder of the Fo Guang Shan Buddhist order.

Overview 
The Temple provides a peaceful and culturally venue for the community including visitors with their multicultural diversity and multi-faith harmony through Humanistic Buddhism.

Program and opening hour 
Chung Tian Temple provides public with some programs below. The details of latest timetable can be checked by on external 3rd party web site

 Meditation class: Every Sunday 9am to 12pm - there are three levels of meditation class related with experience of meditation.
-  Contents: Theories of meditation, Breathing for meditation, posture for meditation 
 Buddhism class for children : Every Sunday 9am to 12 pm 
 Chinese language class: 
- 9am to 12pm
- Saturday morning : Chinese native students 
- Sunday morning : international students 
- levels : seven classes from age five to seventeen.

Building and facilities 
 It is one of the Points of Interest & Landmarks, Sights in QLD
 Chinese School : 8 class rooms and it is registered to QLD Government Chinese Language School. 
 There are several buildings on the site: Bodhisattva Hall, meditation room, restaurant, Lecture Room 
 the highest building on the site: the seven-tiered style of Chung Tian's Pagoda

Activities and cultural performances 
 It is one of the five most-popular tourist sites in Brisbane QLD.
 Children's Happy camp: Two days schedule during September or October each year
 Celebration of Chinese New Year:
The Temple offers the food, funfair, children's activities, Cultural performances, a Light Offering Blessing Service with a Chinese Lion Dance and cultural performances before the date of the Chinese new year.

See also
 IBPS Manila
 Zu Lai Temple
 Nan Hua Temple
 Hsi Lai Temple
 Buddhism in South Africa
 Fo Guang Shan Buddha Museum
 Fo Guang Shan Temple, Auckland

References

External links
 

Buddhist temples in Australia
Asian-Australian culture in Queensland
Fo Guang Shan temples
Pagodas in Australia
Religious buildings and structures completed in 1993
20th-century Buddhist temples
Religious buildings and structures in Queensland
Buildings and structures in Brisbane
1993 establishments in Australia